La cucaracha is a moth in the family Crambidae. It was described by Stanisław Błeszyński in 1966. It is found in Bolivia.

References

Crambini
Moths of South America
Endemic fauna of Bolivia
Moths described in 1966